Kingston is a town in Marshall County, Oklahoma, United States, in the central southern portion of the state close to the border. The population was 1,601 at the 2010 census.

Geography
Kingston is located at  (34.000146, -96.721133).

Demographics

As of the census of 2000, there were 1,390 people, 552 households, and 381 families residing in the town. There were 629 housing units at an average density of 358.3 per square mile (138.0/km2). The racial makeup of the town was 78.56% White, 0.14% African American, 14.68% Native American, 0.95% Asian, 1.80% from other races, and 4.75% from two or more races. 

Hispanic or Latino of any race were 4.39% of the population. Kingston and the surrounding area (towns of Madill and Oakland) have a large Hispanic community due to a large influx of immigrants attracted to the area's manufacturing jobs. The United States Hispanic Chamber of Commerce has estimated Hispanics make up more than 10 percent of this area population.

There were 552 households, out of which 35.0% had children under the age of 18 living with them, 51.6% were married couples living together, 12.9% had a female householder with no husband present, and 30.8% were non-families. 27.7% of all households were made up of individuals, and 15.4% had someone living alone who was 65 years of age or older. The average household size was 2.45 and the average family size was 2.94.

In the town, the population was spread out, with 27.3% under the age of 18, 7.4% from 18 to 24, 27.0% from 25 to 44, 21.7% from 45 to 64, and 16.6% who were 65 years of age or older. The median age was 36 years. For every 100 females, there were 93.3 males. For every 100 females age 18 and over, there were 84.5 males.

The median income for a household in the town was $22,429, and the median income for a family was $30,259. Males had a median income of $25,278 versus $18,403 for females. The per capita income for the town was $11,850. About 18.1% of families and 22.8% of the population were below the poverty line, including 22.6% of those under age 18 and 26.0% of those age 65 or over.

Kingston Is also home to the award-winning "Kingston Show Choir". This group have received superior ratings at district, state, and Tri-State.

History

Kingston was originally known as Helen.  The community was named for Helen Willis, daughter of J.H. Willis, a prominent early-day resident.  On April 4, 1894 a post office was established at Helen and was called Kingston, Indian Territory.  The post office took its name from Jeff King, a longtime local resident.

At the time of its founding, Helen, later Kingston, was located in Pickens County, Chickasaw Nation, in Indian Territory. This was one of the Five Civilized Tribes required to remove to this area from the Southeast United States in the 1830s.

The early settlement included a general store, cotton gin, and a schoolhouse that doubled as a church.

Several of the  older buildings in Kingston were torn down in the late 1980s for redevelopment of the area for a new hardware store and lumberyard.  The town constructed a new multipurpose activity building, which is located on the high school campus.  The oldest remaining building in Kingston, which originally was the town bank, has been adapted for retail use as Dee's Creative Corner.

Kingston's High School Alumni Association, founded in 1911 soon after statehood, is the oldest active alumni association in the state of Oklahoma.  Each year graduates of Kingston High School are given the opportunity to join the association.  Through their donations and fund raisers, the Alumni Association helps to send local students to college.

Notable figures include country music singer, Dale Lay, and rock and roll drummer Greg Upchurch. Lay released several country albums, several radio singles, and performed at the Grand Ole Opry in Nashville, Tennessee. He developed and supported the Kingston High School band. For several years, Lay raised money to buy new instruments and band uniforms at his annual benefit concert. 

Dale’s son, Anthony Lay, is a nationally syndicated radio personality. He goes by the moniker “The AntMan” and hosts a syndicated Saturday night show, "Country House Party", broadcast on more than 80 iHeart Country radio stations across the nation.  

Greg Upchurch began his rock career with the band Puddle of Mudd. Since 2005 he has been the drummer for 3 Doors Down. Upchurch first developed his percussion skills in the Kingston High School band. 

On March 21, 2022, an EF2 tornado caused significant damage to structures.

Kingston High School

After a new high school was built, the original high school building was adapted for use as an elementary school. Today, the elementary, middle, and high schools each have their own buildings.

The school reportedly had a pool, which was filled in and paved to serve as a parking lot. In 2019 a new high school with more classrooms was completed. 

A.E. Findley was the band director of Kingston High School's first band. He was the first band director elected into the Oklahoma Bandmasters Association in 1966.

The high school has two blood drives each year and does a yearly food drive as part of their charity work. 

Kingston High School and Madill High School have a football rivalry, known as the “Marshall County Super Bowl.” The schools alternated as hosts for the bowl games. Madill was the site of the bowl until the teams played again in Fall 2020. That competition was cancelled due to the Covid 19 pandemic. Once vaccines were made available, this competition resumed in Fall 2021, with Kingston being the host school once again.

References

  Kingston OK Visitor Guide

Towns in Marshall County, Oklahoma
Towns in Oklahoma